Oku-iwa Glacier is a glacier flowing to the sea just west of Oku-iwa Rock on the coast of Queen Maud Land. Mapped from surveys and air photos by Japanese Antarctic Research Expedition (JARE), 1957–62, and named after nearby Oku-iwa Rock.

See also
 List of glaciers in the Antarctic
 Glaciology
 Ko-iwa Rock

References

Glaciers of Queen Maud Land
Prince Olav Coast